Bilongo is a surname of Congolese origin. Notable people with the surname include:
Blanche Bilongo (born 1974), Cameroonian actress, screenwriter, presenter, and film editor
Bryant Bilongo (born 2001), English footballer
Geo Bilongo (born 21st-century), Congolese guitarist

Surnames of Congolese origin

Surnames of Central African origin
Surnames of Cameroonian origin
Surnames of the Democratic Republic of the Congo